Landewednack is a civil parish and a hamlet in Cornwall, England, United Kingdom. The hamlet is situated approximately ten miles (16 km) south of Helston.

Landewednack is the most southerly parish on the British mainland. The parish church, dedicated to St Winwallow, is the most southerly in England and is built of local serpentine stone (see St Wynwallow's Church, Landewednack). Caerthillian cove and beach sits on the western border of the parish.

The hamlet of Landewednack is now part of Lizard village.

Twinning
Landewednack is twinned with Landevennec (Landevenneg) in Brittany, France.

References

External links

Civil parishes in Cornwall
Hamlets in Cornwall
Lizard Peninsula